The String Quartet No. 19 in C Major, K. 465 by Wolfgang Amadeus Mozart, nicknamed "Dissonance" on account of its unusual slow introduction, is perhaps the most famous of his quartets. It is the last in the set of six quartets composed between 1782 and 1785 that he dedicated to Joseph Haydn.

According to the catalogue of works Mozart began early the preceding year, the quartet was completed on 14 January 1785.

Movements
As is normal with Mozart's later quartets, it is in four movements:

 Adagio-Allegro
 Andante cantabile in F major
 Menuetto. Allegro. (C major, trio in C minor)
 Allegro molto

The first movement opens with ominous quiet Cs in the cello, joined successively by the viola (on A moving to a G), the second violin (on E), and the first violin (on A), thus creating the "dissonance" itself and narrowly avoiding a greater one.  This lack of harmony and fixed key continues throughout the slow introduction before resolving into the bright C major of the Allegro section of the first movement, which is in sonata form.

Arch shaped lines emphasizing fourths in the first violin (C – F – C) and the violoncello (G – C – C' – G') are combined with lines emphasizing fifths in the second violin and viola. Over the barline between the second and third measures of the example, a fourth-suspension can be seen in the second violin's tied C. In another of his string quartets, KV 464, such fourth-suspensions are also very prominent.

The second movement is in sonatina form, i.e., lacking the development section. Alfred Einstein writes of the coda of this movement that "the first violin openly expresses what seemed hidden beneath the conversational play of the subordinate theme".

The third movement is a minuet and trio, with the exuberant mood of the minuet darkening into the C minor of the trio.

The last movement is also in sonata form.

Notes

References
Einstein, Alfred, trans. Mendel, A., and Broder, N., Mozart, his character, his work. Dover Publications paperback, 1972, republication of 1945 Oxford University Press edition. .

Further reading
 John Irving, Mozart, the "Haydn" quartets. Cambridge: Cambridge University Press (1998)

External links
 
 'Mozart – Quartet in C major, K465 (Dissonance)', lecture by Roger Parker, followed by a performance by the Badke Quartet, Gresham College, 10 October 2007 (available for download as MP3 or MP4, as well as a text document)
Recording by the Borromeo String Quartet from the Isabella Stewart Gardner Museum in MP3 format
 

19
Compositions in C major
1785 compositions